Ahmed Sababti (born 10 December 1985), is a Belgian footballer and futsal player who plays for Futsal Topsport Antwerpen and the Belgian national futsal team.

References

External links
 
 UEFA profile

1985 births
Living people
Belgian men's futsal players